Lythrypnus is a genus of gobies native to the Atlantic and Pacific coasts of the Americas including Cocos Island and the Galapagos Islands.

Species
There are currently 20 recognized species in this genus:
 Lythrypnus alphigena W. A. Bussing, 1990
 Lythrypnus brasiliensis D. W. Greenfield, 1988
 Lythrypnus cobalus W. A. Bussing, 1990
 Lythrypnus crocodilus (Beebe & Tee-Van, 1928) (Mahogany goby)
 Lythrypnus dalli (C. H. Gilbert, 1890) (Bluebanded goby)
 Lythrypnus elasson J. E. Böhlke & C. R. Robins, 1960 (Dwarf goby)
 Lythrypnus gilberti (Heller & Snodgrass, 1903) (Galapagos blue-banded goby)
 Lythrypnus heterochroma Ginsburg, 1939 (Diphasic goby)
 Lythrypnus insularis W. A. Bussing, 1990 (Distant goby)
 Lythrypnus lavenbergi W. A. Bussing, 1990
 Lythrypnus minimus Garzón & Acero P., 1988 (Pygmy goby)
 Lythrypnus mowbrayi (T. H. Bean, 1906)
 Lythrypnus nesiotes J. E. Böhlke & C. R. Robins, 1960 (Island goby)
 Lythrypnus okapia C. R. Robins & J. E. Böhlke, 1964 (Okapi goby)
 Lythrypnus phorellus J. E. Böhlke & C. R. Robins, 1960 (Convict goby)
 Lythrypnus pulchellus Ginsburg, 1938 (Gorgeous goby)
 Lythrypnus rhizophora (Heller & Snodgrass, 1903) (Spotcheek goby)
 Lythrypnus solanensis Acero P., 1981
 Lythrypnus spilus J. E. Böhlke & C. R. Robins, 1960 (Bluegold goby)
 Lythrypnus zebra (C. H. Gilbert, 1890) (Zebra goby)

References

Gobiidae

Ray-finned fish genera
Taxa named by David Starr Jordan